Bernard "Berny" Wolf (July 18, 1911 – September 7, 2006) was an American animator and television producer.

Wolf was born in New York City. His career in animation started in 1927, when he began work as an inker on Charles Mintz' Krazy Kat silent shorts as an Inker along with Dave Tendlar. The shorts were being distributed by Paramount Pictures at the time. He moved to Inkwell Studios shortly afterwards (a predecessor to Fleischer Studios, where he was hired by Max Fleischer as an Inbetweener on Koko the Clown in the silent The Inkwell Imps series. In 1931 he was promoted to the position of Animator and worked with Seymour Kneitel on the Betty Boop cartoons. While much credit has been given to Grim Natwick for her creation, her transformation into the cute cartoon girl was due to the work of Berny Wolf, Seymour Kneitel, Roland Crandall, and Willard Bowsky, who continued working with her after Natwick left in early February 1931 to direct for Ub Iwerks on the west coast. It was at Fleischer Studios that he met Shamus Culhane and Al Eugster, with whom he would maintain a long personal and professional relationship. The three would leave Fleischer to work briefly for Ub Iwerks, where they worked alongside Grim Natwick.

In 1938, Wolf, Eugster and Culhane moved to Walt Disney Studios. After working briefly in the Shorts Department, Wolf moved on to features. He was one of the animators of Pinocchio and Fantasia. His final work at Disney was on Dumbo.

Wolf left Disney after the 1941 strike. He briefly provided uncredited work for Tex Avery at MGM before being drafted during World War II. Wolf was assigned to the First Motion Picture Unit, a group of former Hollywood personnel who created short educational films for the American military. After the war, Wolf worked briefly for animator Rudolph Ising before forming his own company, Animedia Inc. Animedia produced animation for advertising and commercial films. The company also designed some of the costumes used at Walt Disney World, as well as animating segments for Sesame Street.

Wolf folded Animedia in the 1970s in order to return to animation full-time. He produced several animated features for Hanna Barbera, including 1987's The Jetsons Meet the Flintstones. He was Producer of Bobby's World for Film Roman, and was an uncredited Animator on Tom and Jerry: The Movie. He retired from animation in the 1990s, but continued to provide freelance animation pre-production for Fred Wolf Films, commercial design, including developing mascots for the MGM Grand Hotel in Las Vegas. Wolf died in 2006 at the age of 95.

Filmography

References 

Obituary from the LA Times

External links 

Obituary at Cartoon Brew

1911 births
2006 deaths
Animators from New York (state)
Hanna-Barbera people
Fleischer Studios people
Walt Disney Animation Studios people
Metro-Goldwyn-Mayer cartoon studio people
First Motion Picture Unit personnel